Hot Blooded is a 2022 South Korean crime film directed by Cheon Myeong-kwan, and based on the 2016 novel of the same name by Kim Un-su. The film starring Choi Moo-sung, Kim Dong-hwi, Park Byung-eun, Park Hae-joon and Jo Yun-seo. It was released theatrically on March 23, 2022.

Cast
 Jung Woo as Park Hee-soo
 Kim Kap-soo as Son
 Choi Moo-sung as Yong-gang
 Ji Seung-hyun as Chul-jin
 Lee Hong-nae as Ah-mi
 Yoon Ji-hye as In-sook
 Lee Sung-woo as Jung-bae
 Jung Yung-joo as Madam Yoon

Awards and nominations

References

External links
 
 
 

2022 crime films
2022 directorial debut films
2020s Korean-language films
South Korean crime films
Films set in 1993
Films set in Busan
Films shot in Busan
Films based on South Korean novels
Film noir